Roland Edward Harrah (January 20, 1973 – January 3, 1995) was an American film and television child actor, actor, songwriter, musician, singer, and artist.

Biography
Harrah co-starred in adventure dramas, particularly related to Vietnam, which included Braddock: Missing in Action III (1988) with Chuck Norris and in two episodes of the television series Airwolf (1984–1987) with Jan-Michael Vincent.

Born in Denver, Colorado, Harrah moved and lived in Riverside, California for 15 years and acted for 12 years. He died at home in Riverside and was interred at Crestlawn Memorial Park, Riverside, California.

Filmography

Awards and nominations

Memberships and affiliations

Notes

References
 Lentz, Harris M.; and Lentz, Harris M., III, Science Fiction, Horror & Fantasy Film and Television Credits, 2nd Revised Edition, 2261 pages, McFarland & Co., 2001, 3 volumes. Volume 3: .

External links
 
 
  – television movie pilot (1984)
  – seasons 1–3 (1984–86)
  – season 4 (1987)
 

1973 births
1995 deaths
American male child actors
American male film actors
American male television actors
Burials in Riverside County, California
Male actors from Denver
Suicides in California
20th-century American male actors
1995 suicides